Ewert Karlsson (1918–2004), signature EWK, was a Swedish artist and political cartoonist. He drew for Aftonbladet and Land among others.

He illustrated Runer Jonsson's books about Vicke Viking.

In 1979 the EWK was declared Cartoonist of the year of The Sixteenth International Salon of Cartoons of Montréal.  Attached to the general international Catalog  as a tribute to the winning Artist, a personal anthological volume of his own is produced, limited to one thousand copies, by the city of Montréal and it is distributed to all the participating artists of the world 

He was awarded the Illis quorum in both 1988 and 1993.

A museum about EWK and his drawings is located within the Museum of Work in Norrköping, Sweden.

References

External links 
 EWK-sällskapet, EWK society website 
 EWK at the Museum of Work 

Swedish editorial cartoonists
Swedish cartoonists
Swedish illustrators
Swedish children's book illustrators
Swedish caricaturists
1918 births
2004 deaths
People from Östergötland
Recipients of the Illis quorum